David Carnegie may refer to:

Southesk
David Carnegie, 1st Earl of Southesk (1575–1658), Scottish Lord of Session and MP
Sir David Carnegie, 1st Baronet (died 1708), grandson of 1st Earl, Scottish MP for Kincardineshire
Sir David Carnegie, 4th Baronet (1753–1805), de jure 7th Earl, British MP for Aberdeen Burghs and Forfarshire
David Carnegie (explorer) (1871–1900), son of 9th Earl, Scottish explorer and gold prospector in Western Australia
David Carnegie, Earl of Southesk (born 1961), son and heir of James Carnegie, 3rd Duke of Fife and 12th Earl of Southesk

Northesk
David Carnegie, 2nd Earl of Northesk (before 1627–1679)
David Carnegie, 3rd Earl of Northesk (1643–1688)
David Carnegie, 4th Earl of Northesk (before 1685–1729)
David Carnegie, 5th Earl of Northesk (1701–1741)
David Carnegie, 10th Earl of Northesk (1865–1921), Scottish representative peer
David Carnegie, 11th Earl of Northesk (1901–1963), Scottish representative peer and Olympic Skeleton medallist
David Carnegie, 14th Earl of Northesk (1954–2010), Scottish peer

Others
David Carnegie (entrepreneur) (1772–1837), Scottish entrepreneur, founder of Carnegie Investment Bank
David Carnegie (RAF officer) (1897–1964), Royal Air Force air vice-marshal
David Carnegie (scientist) (1868–1949), Scottish scientist, politician,  who worked for the Canadian government